Flaw or flaws may refer to:

Music

Artists 
 Flaw (band), an American numetal band
 The Flaws, an Irish indie-rock band

Albums 
 Flaw (album), by Flaw, 1998
 Flaws (album), by Bombay Bicycle Club, 2010

Songs 
 "Flaws" (song), by Bastille, 2011
 "Flaws", a song by Olly Murs from the 2016 album 24 Hrs
 "Flaws", a song by Take That from the 2014 album III

People 
 Fane Flaws (1951–2021), New Zealand musician
 Tom Flaws (1932–2021), New Zealand cricketer

Other uses 
 Flaw (defect), a product defect
 Flaw (wine), a wine fault
 Character flaw, a literary device
 Flaw, a fictional Lord of Chaos in the DC Comics universe

See also 

 The Flaw (disambiguation)
 Flawless (disambiguation)
 Blemish (disambiguation)
 Defect (disambiguation)
 Fallacy, an error in logical reasoning
 Fault (disambiguation)
 Flaw hypothesis methodology, a computer security technique
 Flaw lead, an oceanographic feature
 Flawed (disambiguation)